Willemina Roziena Catharina (Mirjam) Sterk (born 23 May 1973 in Zeist) is a Dutch former politician, civil servant, NH editor as well as educator. As a member of the Christian Democratic Appeal (Christen-Democratisch Appèl) she was an MP from 23 May 2002 (on maternity leave from 8 April to 29 July 2008, replaced by Sabine Uitslag) to 19 September 2012. She focused on matters of integration policy and social affairs.

Sterk is a member of the Protestant Church in the Netherlands (PKN) and studied theology at Utrecht University. She is married and has three children. From May 2002 to September 2012 she was a member of the Dutch House of Representatives.

Following the controversial French Romani repatriation, Sterk advocated the deportation of Romani from the Netherlands. She said in an interview for Algemeen Dagblad that sending Romani, that are unemployed and cause nuisance, back to Hungary and Romania is a "good approach".

Decorations 
 In 2012 she was awarded Knight of the Order of Orange-Nassau.

References 
  Parlement.com biography

1973 births
Living people
Christian Democratic Appeal politicians
Dutch civil servants
Dutch educators
Dutch women educators
Protestant Church Christians from the Netherlands
Knights of the Order of Orange-Nassau
Members of the House of Representatives (Netherlands)
People from Zeist
Utrecht University alumni
21st-century Dutch politicians
21st-century Dutch women politicians